Sostratus (Sostratos), son of Amyntas, was an aristocratic Macedonian youth who served Alexander the Great. 

Sostratus was implicated in the conspiracy of the pages against Alexander.  As a result, he was executed by stoning with his lover Hermolaus.

References
Who's who in the age of Alexander the Great: prosopography of Alexander's empire  

Executed ancient Macedonian people
People executed by stoning
4th-century BC Macedonians
Conspirators against Alexander the Great
People executed by Alexander the Great
Year of birth unknown
327 BC deaths